The 2014 Tiburon Challenger was a professional tennis tournament played on hard courts. It was the eighth edition of the tournament which was part of the 2014 ATP Challenger Tour. It took place in Tiburon, California, United States between 4 and 10 October 2014.

Singles main-draw entrants

Seeds

 1 Rankings are as of September 15, 2014.

Other entrants
The following players received wildcards into the singles main draw:
  Daniel Nguyen
  Tom Fawcett
  Bjorn Fratangelo
  Jared Donaldson

The following players received entry with a protected ranking into the singles main draw:
  Tennys Sandgren
  John Millman

The following players received entry from the qualifying draw:
  Nils Langer
  Dennis Novikov
  Matt Reid
  Marcos Giron

Champions

Singles

 Sam Querrey def.  John Millman, 6–4, 6–2

Doubles

 Bradley Klahn /  Adil Shamasdin def.  Carsten Ball /  Matt Reid, 7–5, 6–2

External links
Official Website

Tiburon Challenger
Tiburon Challenger
2014 in American tennis
2014 in sports in California